The 2018–19 Samford Bulldogs men's basketball team represented Samford University during the 2018–19 NCAA Division I men's basketball season. The Bulldogs, led by fifth-year head coach Scott Padgett, played their home games at the Pete Hanna Center in Homewood, Alabama as members of the Southern Conference. The Bulldogs finished the season 17–16, 6–12 in SoCon play to finish in tie for sixth place. As the No. 7 seed in the SoCon tournament, they lost in the quarterfinals to UNC Greensboro.

Previous season
The Bulldogs finished the 2017–18 season 10–22, 6–12 in SoCon play to finish in seventh place. They lost in the first round of the SoCon tournament to Chattanooga.

Roster

Schedule and results

|-
!colspan=9 style=| Non-conference regular season

|-
!colspan=9 style=| SoCon regular season

|-
!colspan=9 style=| SoCon tournament

Source

References

Samford Bulldogs men's basketball seasons
Samford
Samford
Samford